Potentilla canadensis, the dwarf cinquefoil, is a  species of cinquefoil (genus Potentilla) native to North America.

The Iroquois take a pounded infusion of the roots as an antidiarrheal. The Natchez give the plant as a drug for those believed to be bewitched.

Along with Potentilla simplex, the plant is an indicator of impoverished soil as well as the host species for the cinquefoil bud gall wasp Diastrophus potentillae.

References

canadensis
Flora of North America
Plants used in traditional Native American medicine
Plants described in 1753
Taxa named by Carl Linnaeus